Sesleria albicans is a species of perennial grass in the family Poaceae which can be found throughout Europe.

Description
Sterile spikelets grow in pairs and carry 2–3 fertile florets. Flowers have three stamens, two stigmas, and are hairy. The fruits have caryopses which have an additional pericarp, a hairy apex, and elliptic hilum.

References

albicans
Flora of Europe